Bani is a department of Séno Province in northern Burkina Faso. Its capital is the town of Bani which has a historic mosque and tower.

Gallery

References

Departments of Burkina Faso
Séno Province